The following lists events that happened during  1958 in New Zealand.

Population
 Estimated population as of 31 December: 2,316,000
 Increase since 31 December 1957: 53,200 (2.35%)
 Males per 100 females: 101.3

Incumbents

Regal and viceregal
Head of State – Elizabeth II
Governor-General – The Viscount Cobham GCMG TD.

Government
The 32nd New Zealand Parliament commenced.  In power was the newly elected Labour government led by Walter Nash.

Speaker of the House – Robert Macfarlane.
Prime Minister – Walter Nash.
Deputy Prime Minister – Jerry Skinner.
Minister of Finance – Arnold Nordmeyer.
Minister of Foreign Affairs – Walter Nash.
Attorney-General – Rex Mason.
Chief Justice — Sir Harold Barrowclough

Parliamentary opposition 
 Leader of the Opposition –   Keith Holyoake (National).

Main centre leaders
Mayor of Auckland – Keith Buttle
Mayor of Hamilton – Roderick Braithwaite
Mayor of Wellington – Frank Kitts
Mayor of Christchurch – Robert Macfarlane then George Manning
Mayor of Dunedin – Leonard Morton Wright

Events 
 26 June – 'Black Budget', raising taxes on tobacco, alcohol and petrol, passed by second Labour government.
 June – New Zealand's first supermarket, Foodtown, opens at Otahuhu.
 3 September – Brian Barratt-Boyes performs New Zealand's first open heart surgery at Auckland's Green Lane Hospital.
 29 September – The emergency number 111 for fire, police and ambulance is introduced; initially only in Masterton and Carterton.
 United States base for Operation Deep Freeze is established at Christchurch Airport.
 The Wairakei Power Station is commissioned. It is New Zealand's first geothermal power station, and only the second large-scale geothermal power station in the world.

Arts and literature
The Robert Burns Fellowship is established to honour the bicentenary of the poet's birth.

See 1958 in art, 1958 in literature, Robert Burns Fellowship, :Category:1958 books

Music

See: 1958 in music

Radio

See: Public broadcasting in New Zealand

Film

See: :Category:1958 film awards, 1958 in film, List of New Zealand feature films, Cinema of New Zealand, :Category:1958 films

Sport

Athletics
Ray Puckett wins his first national title in the men's marathon, clocking 2:37:28 in Lower Hutt.

British Empire and Commonwealth Games

Chess
 The 65th National Chess Championship was held in Christchurch, and was won by J.R. Phillips of Auckland.

Horse racing

Harness racing
 New Zealand Trotting Cup – False Step
 Auckland Trotting Cup – Macklin

Lawn bowls
The national outdoor lawn bowls championships are held in Christchurch.
 Men's singles champion – Phil Skoglund (Northern Bowling Club)
 Men's pair champions – C.J. Rogers, James Pirret (skip) (Tuakau Bowling Club)
 Men's fours champions – W.H. Woods, L.G. Donaldson, A. Connew, Pete Skoglund (skip) (Carlton Bowling Club)

Rugby union
 The All Blacks played three Test matches against the touring Australian side, retaining the Bledisloe Cup:
 23 August, Athletic Park (Wellington), Wellington: New Zealand 25 – 3 Australia
 6 September, Lancaster Park, Christchurch: New Zealand 3 – 6 Australia
 20 September, Epsom Showgrounds, Auckland: New Zealand 17 – 8 Australia

Soccer
 The national men's team played seven matches including five internationals:
 16 August, Wellington: NZ 2 – 3 Australia
 23 August, Auckland: NZ 2 – 2 Australia
 26 August, Hamilton: NZ 3 – 0 Waikato XI
 31 August, Nouméa: NZ 2 – 1 New Caledonia
 7 September, Nouméa: NZ 5 – 1 New Caledonia
 14 September, Nouméa: NZ 2 – 1 New Caledonia
 18 September, Auckland: NZ 1 – 1 Auckland
 The Chatham Cup was won by Seatoun for the second consecutive year. They beat Christchurch city 7–1 in the final.
 Provincial league champions:
	Auckland:	Onehunga
	Bay of Plenty:	Rangers
	Buller:	Millerton Thistle
	Canterbury:	Western
	Hawke's Bay:	Napier Athletic
	Manawatu:	Kiwi United
	Marlborough:	Spartans
	Nelson:	Settlers
	Northland:	Marlin Rovers
	Otago:	Northern AFC
	Poverty Bay:	Eastern Union
	South Canterbury:	West End
	Southland:	Brigadiers
	Taranaki:	City
	Waikato:	Hamilton Technical OB
	Wairarapa:	Masterton Athletic
	Wanganui:	Wanganui Athletic
	Wellington:	Seatoun AFC

Births
 1 January: Lesley Murdoch, cricketer
 7 February: Simon Upton, politician
 30 March: Peter Ellis, convicted for child abuse
 15 April: John Bracewell, cricket player and coach
 16 May (in the U.S.A.): Thomas "Tab" Baldwin, basketball coach
 27 May: Neil Finn, singer, songwriter
 14 September: Jeff Crowe, cricketer
 27 September: Mitch Shirra, motorcycle speedway rider
 17 November: 
 Frank van Hattum, soccer player
 Glenn Dods, soccer player
 23 November: Martin Snedden, cricketer and sports administrator
 30 November: Barry Cooper, cricketer
 2 December: Roger Sowry, politician
 A J Hackett, extreme sports entrepreneur
 (in Zambia): Vicky Jones, children's author
 Pio Terei, actor, singer and comedian
 Jools and Lynda Topp (the Topp Twins), entertainers
 Jane Wrightson, chief censor
:Category:1958 births

Deaths
 12 March – Bill Barnard, politician, 10th Speaker of the House of Representatives
 1 June – Fred Baker, soldier
 2 June – Robert William Smith, politician
 17 July – William Taverner, MP and mayor of Dunedin
 9 October – Merton Hodge, playwright
 25 October – James Chapman-Taylor, architect
 William Montgomery Jr., politician
:Category:1958 deaths

References

See also
List of years in New Zealand
Timeline of New Zealand history
History of New Zealand
Military history of New Zealand
Timeline of the New Zealand environment
Timeline of New Zealand's links with Antarctica

 
Years of the 20th century in New Zealand